Depressaria angelicivora is a moth in the family Depressariidae. It was described by Clarke in 1952. It is found in North America, where it has been recorded from Montana and Washington.

The larvae feed on Angelica arguta.

References

Moths described in 1952
Depressaria
Moths of North America